Moussa Marega (born 14 April 1991) is a professional footballer who plays as a second striker for Saudi Professional League club Al Hilal. Born in France, he represents the Mali national team.

He began his career in France, playing no higher than the Championnat National. After one year with Espérance in Tunisia, he moved to Marítimo of the Primeira Liga in 2015. Shortly afterwards, he signed for Porto. After spending 2016–17 on loan at Vitória de Guimarães, he became a regular in the Porto side and won two league titles in four years. In 2021, he signed with Saudi Arabian club Al-Hilal, where he won the AFC Champions League in his first year.

Marega made his international debut for Mali in 2015, and was part of their squad at the Africa Cup of Nations in 2017 and 2019.

Club career

Early career
Born in Les Ulis, Essonne, to Malian parents, Marega began his career at Évry FC, before moving to Vendée Poiré-sur-Vie Football of the Championnat National in 2012, and fellow league team Amiens a year later. He spent the second half of 2014 in ES Tunis, but could not make a single appearance due to bureaucratic problems.

He subsequently moved to Marítimo in Portugal's Primeira Liga in January 2015. In November 2015, he was sent off in a 1–0 loss at Amarante with two yellow cards and then gestured at the bench; he was suspended from training with the club as a result.

Porto
Both Marega and Marítimo goalkeeper José Sá were on the cusp of a move to Sporting CP in January 2016, but FC Porto signed the pair on contracts lasting to 2020; Marega's buyout clause was set at €40 million. He made 13 appearances in his first campaign at the Estádio do Dragão – mostly as a substitute – and scored once in a 2–0 home win over Gil Vicente in the Taça da Liga on 2 March. His early poor performances drew vocal criticism from some Porto fans, and he took training from a friend on how to become mentally resilient.

On 20 July 2016, Marega was loaned to Vitória de Guimarães for the upcoming season. He made his debut a month later in a 2–0 win against his former team, Marítimo, scoring the second goal, and on 30 October, he scored all three goals in a 3–0 win against Rio Ave to reach 10 goals from 8 games. On 4 November, he received a straight red card in the first half-hour of a 2–1 home win over Nacional for striking Nuno Sequeira, receiving a three-match ban.

On his return to Porto, Marega scored twice in the opening game of the 2017–18 season, a 4–0 home win over Estoril, as a first-half substitute for Tiquinho. He was part of a three-pronged attack made of African players, alongside the Cameroonian Vincent Aboubakar and the Algerian Yacine Brahimi.
He scored 14 league goals in 14 starts, and reportedly began to attract the interest of Premier League sides Manchester United and Chelsea in January 2018. Porto won the league for the first time in five years and Marega was their top scorer (third overall behind Jonas and Bas Dost) with 22 goals.

In November 2018, Marega was awarded the Dragão de Ouro (Golden Dragon) as Porto's best player of the calendar year. Having not previously scored in a European match, Marega scored a goal in six consecutive appearances in the 2018–19 UEFA Champions League, starting with a goal in 1–0 win over Galatasaray, and ending with one in a 3–1 win over Roma, that put Porto in the quarter-finals for the first time in four years.

On 16 February 2020, after scoring the winning goal on his return to Vitória, Marega gave the middle finger to the home fans who had been racially abusing him. The insults continued after this incident and in response, he walked out of the game, and was subsequently substituted. His reaction to the abuse was praised by the Portuguese press, with A Bola newspaper giving Marega a perfect 10 rating in its player ratings. He scored in a 2–0 home win over Sporting on 15 July that year, as his team won the title with two games left to play. On 17 February 2021, he scored a goal in a 2–1 win over Juventus in the 2020–21 UEFA Champions League round of 16.

Al-Hilal
On 10 May 2021, Saudi Arabian club Al-Hilal announced the signing of Marega on a three-year contract as a free transfer, with a salary of €5 million per year. He won the AFC Champions League in his first year, with a goal in the semi-final 2–1 win at compatriots Al Nassr, followed by one in the 2–0 final victory over South Korea's Pohang Steelers.

At the 2022 FIFA Club World Cup, held the following February in Morocco, Marega scored in the final, a 5–3 loss to Real Madrid.

International career
Marega made his debut for the Mali national team on 25 March 2015, in a friendly against Gabon in Beauvais, France; he started in the 4–3 defeat. On 4 September 2016, he scored his first international goal in a 2017 Africa Cup of Nations qualification game against Benin, helping towards a 5–2 win at the Stade du 26 Mars.

In January 2017, he was called up for Mali's squad at the final tournament in Gabon. In the Eagles' opening game against Egypt in Port-Gentil, he was named man of the match in a goalless draw. He also started the other two games of the group stage elimination.

Marega was also called up for the 2019 Africa Cup of Nations in Egypt. He scored in their opening game, a 4–1 win over Mauritania, as they made the last 16. Having not played since the 2019 edition, Marega was not called up for the 2021 Africa Cup of Nations in Cameroon.

Personal life
Marega is a practising Muslim and moved to Saudi Arabia for reasons of faith. He became  father to a son in 2017.

Career statistics

Club

International

Scores and results list Mali's goal tally first, score column indicates score after each Marega goal.

Honours 
Porto
 Primeira Liga: 2017–18, 2019–20
 Taça de Portugal: 2019–20
 Supertaça Cândido de Oliveira: 2020

Al Hilal
 AFC Champions League: 2021
Saudi Professional League: 2021–22
Saudi Super Cup: 2021
FIFA Club World Cup runner-up: 2022

Individual

Primeira Liga Team of the Year: 2017–18
Primeira Liga Forward of the Month: September 2017, December 2017
 Dragão de Ouro: 2018

References

External links

1991 births
Living people
French people of Malian descent
People from Les Ulis
Footballers from Essonne
Malian footballers
French footballers
Association football forwards
Évry FC players
Amiens SC players
Vendée Poiré-sur-Vie Football players
Espérance Sportive de Tunis players
C.S. Marítimo players
FC Porto players
Vitória S.C. players
Al Hilal SFC players
Championnat National 3 players
Championnat National players
Primeira Liga players
Saudi Professional League players
Mali international footballers
2017 Africa Cup of Nations players
2019 Africa Cup of Nations players
French expatriate footballers
Malian expatriate footballers
French expatriate sportspeople in Tunisia
French expatriate sportspeople in Portugal
French expatriate sportspeople in Saudi Arabia
Malian expatriate sportspeople in Tunisia
Malian expatriate sportspeople in Portugal
Malian expatriate sportspeople in Saudi Arabia
Expatriate footballers in Tunisia
Expatriate footballers in Portugal
Expatriate footballers in Saudi Arabia
French Muslims
Malian Muslims